MOATA was a 100 kW thermal Argonaut class reactor built at the Australian Atomic Energy Commission (later ANSTO) Research Establishment at Lucas Heights, Sydney. MOATA went critical at 5:50am on 10 April 1961 and ended operations on 31 May 1995. MOATA was the first reactor to be decommissioned in Australia in 2009.

Background 
The design of university training reactor MOATA was based on the Argonaut research reactor developed by the Argonne National Laboratory in the mid-1950s, in the United States. Moata is an Aboriginal name meaning "gentle-fire" or "fire-stick".

MOATA was designed and built by the Advanced Technology Laboratories and first went critical on 10 April 1961.

The purpose of the reactor was for training scientists, however in the mid-1970s it was expanded to include activation analysis and neutron radiography. MOATA initially offered training in reactor control and neutron physics, later neutron activation analysis, neutron radiography, soil analysis and nuclear medicine research.

Decommissioning 
The reactor was shut down in 1995 as it was no longer possible, after 34 years, to economically justify its continued operations. Experimental data on nuclear fuel and moderator systems was also accumulated during the operation of the reactor. With the dismantling of the reactor complete in 2009, the site has been completely restored. It was the first reactor to be decommissioned in Australia.

In 1995 the used fuel from the reactor was unloaded and in 2006, it was shipped to the United States under the US DoE Foreign Research Reactor Spent Nuclear Fuel Acceptance.

References

Argonaut class reactor
Science and technology in New South Wales
Defunct nuclear reactors